Gabriel Levy (26 May 1881 – 26 March 1965) was a German film producer who was associated with the company Aafa-Film during the 1920s and 1930s. Following the Nazi takeover of power in 1933 the Jewish Levy lost control of the company and was forced into exile in the Netherlands.

Selected filmography
 In the Valleys of the Southern Rhine (1925)
 The Fallen (1926)
 Sword and Shield (1926)
 The Schimeck Family (1926)
 Weekend Magic (1927)
 The Insurmountable (1928)
 The Criminal of the Century (1928)
 Darling of the Dragoons (1928)
 Tempo! Tempo! (1929)
 Hungarian Nights (1929)
 Danube Waltz (1930)
 The Fate of Renate Langen (1931)
 The Woman They Talk About (1931)
 The Beggar Student (1931)
 Peace of Mind (1931)
 My Heart Longs for Love (1931)
 Once There Was a Waltz (1932)
 The Blue of Heaven (1932)
 Distorting at the Resort (1932)
 The Dancer of Sanssouci (1932)
 The Emperor's Waltz (1933)
 Two Good Comrades (1933)

References

Bibliography
 Gerd Gemünden. A Foreign Affair: Billy Wilder's American Films. Berghahn Books, 2008.

External links

1881 births
1965 deaths
German film producers
Levy
Jewish emigrants from Nazi Germany to the Netherlands
Film people from North Rhine-Westphalia